Camaegeria auripicta is a moth of the family Sesiidae. It is known from Cameroon.

This species has a wingspan of 19–25 mm, it is black, with greenish and blue-violet shine. It is close to Camaegeria aristura (Meyrick, 1931), Camaegeria monogama  (Meyrick, 1932) and Camaegeria sophax  (Druce, 1899)

References

Strand, E. 1914a. Neue Lepidoptera aus Kamerun. Gesammelt von Herrn Leutnant v. Rothkirch und Panthen. – Archiv für Naturgeschichte 18(A)(1):41–49.

Endemic fauna of Cameroon
Sesiidae
Moths described in 1914
Insects of Cameroon
Moths of Africa